I Zoi Mou Erotas (Greek: Η Ζωή Μου Έρωτας) is an album by popular Greek artist Natasa Theodoridou, released on November 28, 2010 by Sony Music Greece. All music and lyrics are by Giorgos Moukidis.

Track listing 
"Eho Akoma Polla" (Έχω ακόμα πολλά; I still have a lot) – 3:47
"Psema" (Ψέμα; Α Lie) – 3:35
"Tora Tha Ponas" (Τώρα θα πονάς; Now, it hurts) – 4:29
"Mi Stamatas" (Μη σταματάς; Do not stop!) – 3:35
"Ena Kalo Filo Mou Na Vro" (feat. Nikos Vertis) (Ένα καλό φίλο μου να βρω; A good friend of mine to find) – 3:43
"Rotas" (Ρωτάς; You ask) – 3:50
"Poios Tha Pistepsi" (Ποιος θα πιστέψει; Who would believe?) – 2:52
"Kalinihta" (feat. Giorgos Moukidis) (Καληνύχτα; Good night) – 4:13

Chart performance
The album debuted on the Greek Albums Chart at number one in week 48 of 2010.

References

2010 albums
Greek-language albums
Natasa Theodoridou albums
Sony Music Greece albums